

George M. Borrello (born May 27, 1967) is an American businessman and politician. He is currently a New York State Senator representing District 57 since 2019. Previously, he served as County Executive for Chautauqua County, New York from 2018 to 2019. He first entered politics when he served as a Chautauqua County Legislator from 2010 to 2017. In 2019, he ran for New York State Senate for District 57 against Austin Morgan to fill the vacancy left by the resignation of Catharine Young. On November 5, 2019, he defeated Morgan with 67.29% of the vote. On November 26, 2019, he took office as State Senator.

Early life and career
Borrello was born and raised in Silver Creek and Fredonia, New York. He graduated from Fredonia High School in 1985 and Purdue University in 1989. He founded Top-Shelf Marketing, a supplier in the hospitality industry. Later, he merged the company with Progressive Specialty Glass Company and was Vice President of Marketing until 2017, when he retired to run for County Executive.

Politics
Borrello was elected to the Chautauqua County Legislature in 2009, where he served four terms from January 1, 2010 to December 31, 2017. As a Legislator, he served as Vice Chair of Audit and Control Committee and Chair of the Planning and Economic Development Committee. In 2017, he was elected County Executive, succeeding Vince Horrigan, who decided not to seek another term.

2019 New York State Senate special election
After the resignation of State Senator Catharine Young in March 2019, Borrello announced his candidacy for New York State Senate District 57. In June 2019, he defeated Allegany County Legislator Curt Crandall in the Republican Primary. He defeated Democratic nominee Austin Morgan in the general election. Borrello was also endorsed by the Conservative, Independence, and Libertarian Parties. Borrello went on to defeat Morgan in the 2019 general election.

References

1967 births
Living people
Republican Party New York (state) state senators
People from Chautauqua County, New York
People from Silver Creek, New York
Purdue University alumni
County legislators in New York (state)
County executives in New York (state)
21st-century American politicians